Michael Gregg is an American computer security specialist, businessman  and an author and coauthor of several books, including Build Your Own Network Security Lab and Inside Network Security Assessment. He has served as an expert witness before congressional committee on cyber security and identity theft.

Career 

Gregg holds two associate degrees, a bachelor's degree and a master's degree. 

He has been quoted in newsprint and featured on various television and radio shows including, NPR, The New York Times, ABC, CBS, Fox TV and others discussing cybersecurity and ethical hacking. 

He is the lead faculty member for Villanova University's online Cyber Security program.

He also holds several certifications, including MCSE, MCT, CTT, A+, N+, CNA, CCNA, CIW Security Analyst, and TICSA.

Publications 

Gregg has contributed to the following published works:

 CISSP Exam Cram Questions 2nd edition Que Publishing 
 CISSP Exam Cram Que 2nd edition Publishing 
 CISSP Exam Cram Que 1st edition Publishing 
 Inside Network Security Assessment Sams Publishing 
 Certified Ethical Hacker Exam Prep Que Publishing 
 Hack the Stack Syngress Publishing 
 Syngress Force 2006 Emerging Threat Analysis: From Mischief to Malicious 
 Security Administrator Street Smarts 2nd edition Sybex 
 Security + Study Guide Syngress 
 CHFI Study Guide Syngress 
 InfoSecurity 2008 Threat Analysis Syngress 
 CompTIA Security+ Certification Kit 
 CISA Exam Prep Que 
 Build Your Own Security Lab Wiley 

Gregg has written articles for print and Internet publications such as:
 http://www.certmag.com/issues/dec02/feature_gregg.cfm
 http://gocertify.com/article/ceh.shtml
 http://searchnetworking.techtarget.com/generic/0,295582,sid7_gci1226646,00.html
 http://www.cramsession.com/articles/get-article.asp?aid=1084

References

External links 
 CNBC video on iPhone application vulnerabilities
 Fox News Report on Google hack leaked to Internet
 Villanova University Gains CNSS National Standard 4011 NSA Certification
 Experts warn of IE vulnerability
 Cybersecurity
 5 tips for safe online shopping
 Network penetration testing
 Phone hacking threat low but it does exist
 Michael Gregg discusses browser hijacking on CBS5
 Cyberwar could cause global collateral damage
 Hackers target cell phones
 Hacker Halted presenters
 Michael Gregg Expert Answer Page
 MALC caucus
 Author interview
 Network security, taking the layered approach
 Cyber-security expert teaches how to guard against hackers
 Expert witness at congressional hearing 

Year of birth missing (living people)
Living people
American technology writers
People in information technology
Writers about computer security